For the town near Tripoli, see Janzur.

Zawiyat Janzur, or Zawiyat Zanzur, also Zauiet Gianzur is a small coastal village located at Cyrenaica in eastern Libya. It's linked by road with Bi'r al Ashhab to the south.

Janzur is known as the birthplace of Omar Mukhtar, the Libyan resistance leader during the Italian rule.

Notes

Populated places in Butnan District